Ena Swansea (born 1966) is an artist based in New York City.

Swansea was born in Charlotte, North Carolina and attended film school at the University of South Florida in Tampa.

Work

Swansea currently lives and works in New York. She is represented by Friedman Benda Gallery in New York, Lock Gallery in Philadelphia, Ben Brown Fine Arts in London, Hans Meyer in Düsseldorf, 313 in Seoul, and Arndt Berlin. She works primarily in oil paint on a graphite foundation, often painting brightly colored figures on a dark iridescent background. Swansea draws heavily from her southern roots, including the story of her ancestor Southern Baptist preacher Thomas Dixon. "No one as yet has really pointed out that my paintings, whether they are of New York City or something else, carry a piece of the most disturbed part of United States history in them, as is my genetic burden, one might say." 

As Barry Schwabsky describes in his 2017 review of Swansea's work in Artforum, "Swansea has developed an unusual technique of painting on a graphite-infused ground, which seems to situate everything in a darkly glimmering, indistinct twilit space; you might even call the resulting light effects Caravaggesque. On this ground, where brush marks often seem to float discretely, the paintings’ imagery may appear to be in a state of dissolution—but it never comes close to being unrecognizable."

Swansea's exhibition, Psycho, at the Deichtorhallen / Sammlung Falckenberg, was a selection of over 40 of Swansea's paintings from 2002–2012, chosen from various European collections. The exhibition was hung concurrently with paintings by Finnish artist Robert Lucander. Critic Belinda Grace Gardner says of Swansea's work, "Her compositions have the evasiveness of dreams or afterimages that briefly manifest themselves on the edges of perception."

In 2009, the Musée d'Art Moderne Grand-Duc Jean (MUDAM), Luxembourg held a survey of 5 years of Swansea's paintings (October 11, 2008 – February 2, 2009).  Arndt & Partner Gallery Zurich showed "recent paintings,” October 23 – November 22, 2008.

Her work is included in several public collections, including the Museum of Modern Art in New York, the Staatliche Kunstsammlungen Dresden, Sammlung Falckenberg, Hamburg; the Olbricht Collection, Berlin; Cornell University's Herbert F. Johnson Museum of Art, Ithaca, NY; and Boca Raton Museum of Art, Boca Raton, FL.

Critical writing on Swansea's work has been published internationally, including Art in America, monopol, Parkett, The Art Newspaper, The Brooklyn Rail, Flash Art, Fantom, The New York Sun, ArtNet, ARTinvestor, and Art – Das Kunstmagazin.

Exhibitions

Recent solo exhibitions of Ena Swansea's work have taken place at Ben Brown Fine Arts, London; Robilant+Voena, St Moritz;  Gaa Gallery, Provincetown, MA; Ben Brown Fine Arts, Hong Kong; and Albertz Benda Gallery, NY. 

Selected group exhibitions include De la Tauromaquia à la Goyesque, Hommage à Francisco de Goya, Musée des Cultures Taurines
Henriette et Claude Viallat, Nîmes; Against Forgetting I, Gaa Gallery Provincetown, MA; The Grass is Green, Gaa Gallery Cologne Project Space, Cologne; Sight unseen, Ellen Harvey and Ena Swansea, Locks Gallery, Philadelphia, PA, Greater New York, MoMAPS1, New York, Goetz meets Falckenberg, Sammlung Falckenberg, Hamburg, The Triumph of Painting part 3, Saatchi Gallery in London, “Central Station” at La Maison Rouge in Paris, Back to the Figure - Contemporary Painting, Museum Franz Gertsch, Burgdorf, Symbolism, Von der Heyt Museum, Wuppertal (catalog ) True Romance - Allegories of Love from the Renaissance to the Present, Kunsthalle Wien as well as in “Story-Tellers” at Kunsthalle Hamburg.

Past exhibitions: 
 how six men got on in the world, Fresh Eggs Gallery, Berlin, May 1–17, 2014
 untitled nightlife and sofa, Friedman Benda Gallery, New York, January 21 - February 15, 2014
 come like shadows, group show curated by David Cohen, Zürcher Gallery, New York, December 18, 2013 - February 25, 2014
 new paintings, Locks Gallery, Philadelphia, October 18 - November 23, 2013
 and those who were seen dancing were thought to be insane by those who could not hear the music, Freidman Benda Gallery, New York, July 16 - August 17, 2013
 new paintings, 313 Gallery, Seoul, December 16 – January 25, 2013
 Psycho, 41 paintings from 2002 - 2011 in European collections, Deichtorhallen/Sammlung Falckenberg, Hamburg, December 18, 2011 - March 25, 2012
 studio show, organized by ARNDT Berlin, New York, February 26 - March 7, 2011
 Printer's Proof, Bertrand Delacroix Gallery, New York, January 18 - February 14, 2011
 Changing the World, ARNDT, Berlin, April 29 - May 30, 2011
 Armory Show, New York, solo booth, ARNDT Berlin, March 3 – 7, 2010
 Water is Best, Locks Gallery, Philadelphia, October 21 – November 28, 2009
 Naked!, Paul Kasmin Gallery, curated by Adrian Dannatt and Paul Kasmin, New York,  July 9 – September 19, 2009
 the beginning, 313 Gallery, Seoul, Korea, June 6–28, 2009

Public projects

In 2010, Swansea was selected as the first American artist to produce a “Goyesque” occupying the entire sand floor of the ancient Roman bullfighting arena in Arles. The ephemeral painting, 150 x 300 feet, existed for about an hour, erased by the feet of bulls and matadors.

Life
She is married to Antoine Guerrero, Executive and Artistic Director of Whitebox Art Center, and former Director of Operations and Exhibitions at MoMAPS1. Swansea is the widow of film critic Joel Siegel with whom she has a son.

References

External links
Ena Swansea's Website

Living people
American women painters
1966 births
20th-century American painters
American contemporary painters
20th-century American women artists
21st-century American women artists